Alice Bloomfield FRCS FRCOG(13 October 1895 – 5 January 1977) was a Scottish gynaecological surgeon and Fellow of the Royal College of Obstetricians and Gynaecologists, recognised for her active involvement in the London medical community.

Early life 
Alice Bloomfield was born in India to a merchant father. Following the death of her father who was murdered by terrorists, she moved to Scotland with her mother and sister.

Education 

Bloomfield was a medical student at the University of Edinburgh where she earned several academic accolades, including the Annandale Gold Medal for clinical surgery and the silver medal for systematic chemistry. In 1919, Bloomfield graduated from the University of Edinburgh with first class honours. She was later awarded the Leckie Mactier postgraduate scholarship and the William Gibson research fellowship. She completed her MD in 1921, became a Fellow of the Royal College of Surgeons in 1922 and completed a Master's in Surgery in 1929.

Career 

At the age of 28, after completing resident appointments at the Hospital for Women in Soho Square and Queen Charlotte's Hospital, Bloomfield became consultant surgeon in gynaecology at the South London Hospital for Women where she spent most of her career. She was also employed by the Marie Curie Hospital.

Bloomfield was active in the London medical community and was a founder member of the Royal College of Obstetricians and Gynaecologists (RCOG). In 1935, she was appointed as a fellow of the College at the behest of co-founder Sir William Fletcher Shaw. She served three terms on the RCOG Council: 1942-1944, 1946-1948 and 1951-1953, and later served as Chair of the Examining Board. Bloomfield was also a founder of the Women's Visiting Gynaecological Club, a member of the Women's Medical Federation, and participated in the 1942 Minister of Health's Medical Advisory Committee to advise on the development of Health Services in the United Kingdom.

Bloomfield presented several papers at the Royal Society of Medicine and wrote on subjects like abdominal surgery on the uterus, the effects of prolonged oestrogen administration, and male and female infertility.

Bloomfield was a part of many different research projects and help contribute to many medical discoveries. She helped author "The Development of The Lower End of The Vagina" in 1927. In this journal, Bloomfield works alongside J. Ernest Frazer to break down each part of the lower end of the vagina into 3 different main groups. Bloomfield made a name for herself in other medical journals and articles as well, some that were included in the "Section of Obstetrics in Gynaecology"  are,

 Cyst Occupying the Utero-Vesical Space 
 Case of Patient Wolffian Duct 
 A Case of Primary Carcinoma of the Fallopian Tube

Later life 
Following her retirement from medicine, Bloomfield studied law. At the age of 70, she was called to the Bar from Gray's Inn and practised as a criminal barrister in the south western circuit. She was even taking classes to learn the language of Spanish in her final days of her life. Throughout her life, Bloomfield was known for being kind and gracious towards her patients, but was considered to be temperamental with her colleagues and other peer members.

References

External links 

 Thesis: Artificial pneumothorax in the treatment of pulmonary tuberculosis (1921)

Alumni of the University of Edinburgh
British obstetricians
British gynaecologists
Women gynaecologists
1895 births
1977 deaths
20th-century women lawyers
British people in colonial India
Members of Gray's Inn